Alec Gray may refer to:

Alec Gray (footballer) (1891–1945), Australian rules footballer
Alec Gray (horticulturalist) (1895–1986), English plantsman
Alec Gray (socialist), English socialist